The Agenzia per la Cybersicurezza Nazionale (ACN) was established in Italy in 2021 on the basis of the decree law of June 14, 2021, n. 82.

The ACN is an Italian government body established with resilience and security tasks in information technology, also for the purpose of protecting national security in the cyberspace, and ensures coordination between the public entities involved in the matter.

It pursues the achievement of national and European strategic autonomy in the digital sector, in synergy with the national production system, as well as through the involvement of the university and research world. It favors specific training courses for the development of the workforce in the sector and supports awareness campaigns as well as a widespread culture of cybersecurity.

Cyberattack alerts, monitoring, detection and prevention activities 
The agency constantly carries out activities of alert, monitoring, detection and prevention of cyber attacks as in the case of the massive global cyberattack of February 5, 2023.
During the cyberattack, a large part of the TIM network was out of order due to a problem with data flows from the international network which also had an impact in Italy.
The attack exploited a vulnerability on VMware ESXi servers.
The damage on the Italian national network have amounted to millions of euros, thousands of servers affected.
However, the following day, the agency reduced the scope of the attack, reporting that no critical systems were affected.
On 22 February 2023, the agency issued a new alert against an attack perpetrated by Russian activists. The cyberattack is claimed by the pro-Russian group NoName057.
On March 7, 2023, the director of the agency, Roberto Baldoni resigned for  differences with the Italian government, following the cyber-attacks suffered by Italy.
The pro-Russian group NoName057 comments on the resignation of Roberto Baldoni on its Telegram channel, claiming the attacks against the Italian internet infrastructure as a complete success.
On March 9, 2023, the prefect of Rome, Bruno Frattasi, was appointed new director of the agency in place of the resigned Roberto Baldoni.

Cyberwarfare
The agency carries out protection and prevention actions against Cyberwarfare.
The cyberattacks mainly have affected hospitals, public facilities, government bodies, and energy production plants.

References

See also
 List of cyber warfare forces
 Information assurance vulnerability alert
 Cooperative Cyber Defence Centre of Excellence (NATO)
 Cyberwarfare
 Security hacker
 CINECA

Government agencies of Italy
Government agencies established in 2021
2021 establishments in Italy
Cyber Security in Italy